Alfoz de Bricia is a municipality located in the province of Burgos, Castile and León, Spain. According to the 2004 census (INE), the municipality has a population of 119 inhabitants.

The Alfoz de Bricia is composed of eleven towns: Barrio de Bricia (seat or capital), Bricia, Campino, Cilleruelo de Bricia, Linares de Bricia, Lomas de Villamediana, Montejo de Bricia, Presillas, Valderías, Villamediana de Lomas and Villanueva de Carrales.

References 

Municipalities in the Province of Burgos